Miami airport, Miami aeroport, Miami aerodrome, Miami airfield or variation, may refer to:

Miami-Dade, Florida

Airports
 Miami International Airport (IATA aerodrome code: MIA, ICAO airport code: KMIA, FAA airfield code: MIA), Miami-Dade County, Florida, USA; formerly Wilcox Field; serving the city of Miami
 Miami Executive Airport (IATA aerodrome code: TMB, ICAO airport code: KTMB, FAA airfield code: TMB), Miami-Dade County, Florida, USA; formerly Kendall-Tamiami Executive; serving the city of Miami
 Miami-Opa Locka Executive Airport (IATA aerodrome code: OPF, ICAO airport code: KOPF, FAA airfield code: OPF), Miami-Dade County, Florida, USA; formerly Opa-locka Airport; serving the cities of Miami and Opa-Locka
 Coast Guard Air Station Miami, USCG air station
 Miami Homestead General Aviation Airport (FAA airfield code: X51), Miami-Dade County, Florida, USA; formerly Homestead Airport
 Miami Army Airfield, Miami, Miami-Dade, Florida, USA; a former WWII airforce base that shut down after the Cuban Missile Crisis
 Miami Seaplane Base (FAA airfield code: X44), Watson Island, Miami, Florida, USA
 Miami Heliport, Watson Island, Miami, Florida, USA

Other
 Miami-Dade Aviation Department, airport authority for Miami-Dade, operating several regional airports
 Miami Airport (Tri-Rail station), new commuter rail station serving Miami International Airport
 Hialeah Market/Miami Airport (Tri-Rail station), old commuter rail station serving Miami International Airport
 Miami Airport Expressway (S.R. 112) connecting Miami International Airport to Miami Beach

Other airports
 Miami County Airport (FAA airfield code: K81), Miami County, Kansas, USA; serving the city of Paola
 Miami Municipal Airport (IATA aerodrome code: MIO, ICAO airport code: KMIO, FAA airfield code: MIO), Miami, Ottawa County, Oklahoma, USA
 Miami University Airport (IATA aerodrome code: OXD, ICAO airport code: KOXD, FAA airfield code: OXD), Butler County, Ohio, USA; a public airport serving the city of Oxford, operated by Miami University
 Miami Valley Hospital Heliport (FAA airfield code: 00OI), Dayton, Montgomery County, Ohio, USA; a private hospital heliport

Other uses
 Airport 24/7: Miami, a Travel Channel USA reality TV program documenting activity at Miami International Airport

See also

 Port Miami (disambiguation)
 Airport (disambiguation)
 Miami (disambiguation)